Abinash Bikram Shah (Nepali: अविनाश बिक्रम शाह) is a Nepalese director, writer and producer. He is the first Nepalese filmmaker to be officially selected for Cannes Film Festival, where his short film Lori (Melancholy of my Mother's Lullabies) was selected to compete for Short Film Palme d'Or at 2022 Cannes Film Festival, and won Special Jury Mention.

Filmography 
As a Writer

 Highway (2012)
 Kalo Pothi: The Black Hen (2015)

As a Director

 I am Happy (2013) (Short Film)
 Tattini: The Moon is Bright Tonight (2018) (Short Film)
 Lori: Melancholy of my Mother's Lullabies (2022) (Short Film)

External links

References 

Living people
Nepalese writers
Nepalese directors
Nepalese producers
Year of birth missing (living people)